In biochemistry, equilibrium unfolding is the process of unfolding a protein or RNA molecule by gradually changing its environment, such as by changing the temperature or pressure, pH, adding chemical denaturants, or applying force as with an atomic force microscope tip. If the equilibrium was maintained at all steps, the process theoretically should be reversible during equilibrium folding. Equilibrium unfolding can be used to determine the thermodynamic stability of the protein or RNA structure, i.e. free energy difference between the folded and unfolded states.

Theoretical background

In its simplest form, equilibrium unfolding assumes that the molecule may belong to only two thermodynamic states, the folded state (typically denoted N for "native" state) and the unfolded state (typically denoted U).  This "all-or-none" model of protein folding was first proposed by Tim Anson in 1945, but is believed to hold only for small, single structural domains of proteins (Jackson, 1998); larger domains and multi-domain proteins often exhibit intermediate states.  As usual in statistical mechanics, these states correspond to ensembles of molecular conformations, not just one conformation.

The molecule may transition between the native and unfolded states according to a simple kinetic model 
N  U
The dimensionless equilibrium constant  can be used to determine the conformational stability  by the equation

Thus,  is positive if the unfolded state is less stable (i.e., disfavored) relative to the native state.

The most direct way to measure the conformational stability  of a molecule with two-state folding is to measure its kinetic rate constants  and  under the solution conditions of interest. However, since protein folding is typically completed in milliseconds, such measurements can be difficult to perform, usually requiring expensive stopped flow or (more recently) continuous-flow mixers to provoke folding with a high time resolution.

Chemical denaturation

(In equilibrium folding, the reverse process is carried out.) Given that the fractions must sum to one and their ratio must be given by the Boltzmann factor, we have

Protein stabilities are typically found to vary linearly with the denaturant concentration. A number of models have been proposed to explain this observation prominent among them being the denaturant binding model, solvent-exchange model (both by John Schellman) and the Linear Extrapolation Model (LEM; by Nick Pace). All of the models assume that only two thermodynamic states are populated/de-populated upon denaturation. They could be extended to interpret more complicated reaction schemes.

The denaturant binding model assumes that there are specific but independent sites on the protein molecule (folded or unfolded) to which the denaturant binds with an effective (average) binding constant k. The equilibrium shifts towards the unfolded state at high denaturant concentrations as it has more binding sites for the denaturant relative to the folded state. In other words, the increased number of potential sites exposed in the unfolded state is seen as the reason for denaturation transitions. An elementary treatment results in the following functional form:

where  is the stability of the protein in water and [D] is the denaturant concentration. Thus the analysis of denaturation data with this model requires 7 parameters: ,, k, and the slopes and intercepts of the folded and unfolded state baselines.

The solvent exchange model (also called the ‘weak binding model’ or ‘selective solvation’) of Schellman invokes the idea of an equilibrium between the water molecules bound to independent sites on protein and the denaturant molecules in solution. It has the form:

This model tries to answer the question of whether the denaturant molecules actually bind to the protein or they seem to be bound just because denaturants occupy about 20-30% of the total solution volume at high concentrations used in experiments, i.e. non-specific effects  – and hence the term ‘weak binding’. As in the denaturant-binding model, fitting to this model also requires 7 parameters. One common theme obtained from both these models is that the binding constants (in the molar scale) for urea and guanidinium hydrochloride are small: ~ 0.2  for urea and 0.6  for GuHCl.

Intuitively, the difference in the number of binding sites between the folded and unfolded states is directly proportional to the differences in the accessible surface area. This forms the basis for the LEM which assumes a simple linear dependence of stability on the denaturant concentration. The resulting slope of the plot of stability versus the denaturant concentration is called the m-value. In pure mathematical terms, m-value is the derivative of the change in stabilization free energy upon the addition of denaturant. However, a strong correlation between the accessible surface area (ASA) exposed upon unfolding, i.e. difference in the ASA between the unfolded and folded state of the studied protein (dASA), and the m-value has been documented by Pace and co-workers. In view of this observation, the m-values are typically interpreted as being proportional to the dASA. There is no physical basis for the LEM and it is purely empirical, though it is widely used in interpreting solvent-denaturation data. It has the general form:

When combined with kinetic data on folding, the m-value can be used to roughly estimate the amount of buried hydrophobic surface in the folding transition state.

Structural probes

Unfortunately, the probabilities  and  cannot be measured directly.  Instead, we assay the relative population of folded molecules using various structural probes, e.g., absorbance at 287 nm (which reports on the solvent exposure of tryptophan and tyrosine), far-ultraviolet circular dichroism (180-250 nm, which reports on the secondary structure of the protein backbone), dual polarisation interferometry (which reports the molecular size and fold density) and near-ultraviolet fluorescence (which reports on changes in the environment of tryptophan and tyrosine).  However, nearly any probe of folded structure will work; since the measurement is taken at equilibrium, there is no need for high time resolution.  Thus, measurements can be made of NMR chemical shifts, intrinsic viscosity, solvent exposure (chemical reactivity) of side chains such as cysteine, backbone exposure to proteases, and various hydrodynamic measurements.

Hence, the observed value equals the linear sum

Thermal denaturation

The thermodynamic observables of denaturation can be described by the following equations:

where ,  and  indicate the enthalpy, entropy and Gibbs free energy of unfolding under a constant pH and pressure. The last equation is known as the Gibbs–Helmholtz equation.

Determining the heat capacity of proteins
However, it is difficult to obtain accurate values for  this way. More accurately, the  can be derived from the variations in  vs.  which can be achieved from measurements with slight variations in pH or protein concentration. Note that any non-linearity of the datapoints indicates that  is probably not independent of the temperature.

Alternatively, the  can also be estimated from the calculation of the accessible surface area (ASA) of a protein prior and after thermal denaturation as follows:

For proteins that have a known 3d structure, the  can be calculated through computer programs such as Deepview (also known as swiss PDB viewer). The  can be calculated from tabulated values of each amino acid through the semi-empirical equation:

where the subscripts polar, non-polar and aromatic indicate the parts of the 20 naturally occurring amino acids.

Assessing two-state unfolding
Furthermore, one can assess whether the folding proceeds according to a two-state unfolding as described above. This can be done with differential scanning calorimetry by comparing the calorimetric enthalpy of denaturation i.e. the area under the peak,  to the van 't Hoff enthalpy described as follows:

at  the  can be described as:

The  is the height of the heat capacity peak.

Generalization to protein complexes and multi-domain proteins

Using the above principles, equations that relate a global protein signal, corresponding to the folding states in equilibrium, and the variable value of a denaturing agent, either temperature or a chemical molecule, have been derived for homomeric and heteromeric proteins, from monomers to trimers and potentially tetramers. These equations provide a robust theoretical basis for measuring the stability of complex proteins, and for comparing the stabilities of wild type and mutant proteins. Such equations cannot be derived for pentamers of higher oligomers because of mathematical limitations (Abel–Ruffini theorem).

References

Further reading
 Pace CN. (1975) "The Stability of Globular Proteins", CRC Critical Reviews in Biochemistry, 1-43.
 Santoro MM and Bolen DW. (1988) "Unfolding Free Energy Changes Determined by the Linear Extrapolation Method. 1. Unfolding of Phenylmethanesulfonyl α-Chymotrypsin Using Different Denaturants", Biochemistry, 27, 8063–8068.
 Privalov PL. (1992) "Physical Basis for the Stability of the Folded Conformations of Proteins", in Protein Folding, TE Creighton, ed., W. H. Freeman, pp. 83–126.
 Yao M and Bolen DW. (1995) "How Valid Are Denaturant-Induced Unfolding Free Energy Measurements?  Level of Conformance to Common Assumptions over an Extended Range of Ribonuclease A Stability", Biochemistry, 34, 3771–3781.
 Jackson SE. (1998) "How do small single-domain proteins fold?", Folding & Design, 3, R81-R91.
 Schwehm JM and Stites WE. (1998) "Application of Automated Methods for Determination of Protein Conformational Stability", Methods in Enzymology, 295, 150–170.

Protein structure
Equilibrium chemistry